The R383 is a Regional Route in South Africa that connects Kenhardt with the N8 between Groblershoop and Griekwastad.

Its western origin is the R27 at Kenhardt. From there, it heads east to Putsonderwater. I then heads south-east to Marydale, where it is briefly co-signed with the N10 heading north. It diverges, again heading east to Westerburg. Here it crosses the Orange River to reach Koegas. From there it heads north-east to its terminus on the N8.

External links
 Routes Travel Info

References

Regional Routes in the Northern Cape